Otto Linne (2 December 1869 – 4 June 1937) was a German architect. His work was part of the architecture event in the art competition at the 1928 Summer Olympics.

References

1869 births
1937 deaths
19th-century German architects
20th-century German architects
Olympic competitors in art competitions
Architects from Bremen